The University of Memphis Tigers batboy, Stan Bronson Jr. (July 19, 1928 – January 9, 2018), was known as a living legend in Tiger baseball, and now holds a place in history as the "Most Durable Batboy" ever, as approved by the 2008 edition of Guinness World Records. Bronson was the University of Memphis' baseball batboy for over 50 years.

Bronson came to the University of Memphis (then Memphis State University) in 1958 when he asked head football Coach Billy "Spook" Murphy for a job with the football team. Bronson's first job with the U of M was picking up footballs whenever the kickers would practice on the sidelines. He worked in the capacity as an equipment manager for the football team until he was in his 60s. In addition he served as the baseball program's batboy beginning in 1958 for a span of over 50 years. During Bronson's tenure as the batboy, he participated in approximately 2,353 games. Every time a Tiger home game reached the middle of the eighth inning, Stan "The Man" Bronson made his way to home plate where he acknowledged the University of Memphis "Tiger faithful" who made it out to the game.

On April 25, 2010, Bronson's jersey was retired and displayed on the right field wall of FedExPark, joining Dave Anderson, Mark Little, Bobby Kilpatrick, and Mike Paxton.

Stan Bronson died in his sleep on January 9, 2018.

References 

1928 births
2018 deaths
University of Memphis people
Baseball people
Place of birth missing